Gérard Lamy (May 2, 1919 – October 26, 2016) was a Canadian Social Credit Party politician. He served as a Member of the House of Commons of Canada from 1962 to 1963.

Early life

He was born on May 2, 1919 in Grand-Mère, Quebec and was a contractor before running for office.

Member of Parliament

Lamy successfully ran as a Social Credit Party of Canada candidate for the district of Saint-Maurice—Laflèche in the 1962 federal election, against Liberal incumbent J.A. Richard.

He was among twenty-six Social Credit members from Quebec who were elected for the first time that year.

He lost his re-election bid in the 1963 federal election, against Liberal and future prime minister, Jean Chrétien.

Attempts to make a political comeback

He also ran as a Ralliement créditiste du Québec candidate in the 1970 provincial election in the district of Saint-Maurice and as a Progressive Conservative candidate in the district of Champlain in the 1979 federal election, but was each time defeated.

Lamy did not run again after 1979.

Footnotes

1919 births
2016 deaths
Members of the House of Commons of Canada from Quebec
People from Shawinigan
Social Credit Party of Canada MPs